Niron Hashai (born 1965) is an Israeli business scholar.  He is a professor of strategy and international business, and the dean of the Arison School of Business at Reichman University.

Biography 
Hashai was born in Netanya, Israel in 1965. He is the son of Bella and Yehuda Hashai.

In 2007, the Israel Strategy Conference was founded by Dovev Lavie, Ithai Stern and Niron Hashai. In 2017, Hashai moved to the Arison School of Business at Reichman University, and in 2021 he became dean of the school.   Hashai's research covers areas such as: theory of the multinational corporation, technological innovation, diversification, and growth patterns of high technology firms. Hashai has an h-index of 21 and his work has been published in various management/business journals. He is a member of the editorial board of the Strategic Management Journal, Journal of International Business Studies and Global Strategy Journal.

His research contribution includes:

Introducing innovative models that analyze the impact of knowledge transfer within multinational companies on MNEs' location and outsourcing decisions., identifying unique stages in the international expansion processes of small and young high-tech companies  and Presenting the complexity of the relationship between a company's product diversity and performance.

Published works

Books 

 Ramamurti, R. & Hashai, N. (eds.), The Future of Foreign Direct Investment and the Multinational Enterprise, Emerald, 2011. 
 Almor T. & Hashai, N. (eds.), FDI, International Trade and the Economics of Peacemaking, The College of Management, Academic Studies, 2000.

Selected Articles 
 Hashai, N., Within-Industry Diversification and Firm Performance—An S-shaped Hypothesis. Strategic Management Journal, 36(9), 2015, pp. 1378–1400
 Hashai, N., Sequencing the Expansion of Geographic Scope and Foreign Operations of 'Born Global' Firms. Journal of International Business Studies, 42(8), 2011, pp. 994–1015

References

External links 
  at Reichman University
 

Living people
1965 births
Academic staff of Reichman University
Tel Aviv University alumni
Technion – Israel Institute of Technology alumni
Hebrew University of Jerusalem
Academics of the University of Manchester
People from Netanya